The Reeves-Melson House is a historic house in rural Montgomery County, Arkansas. It is a private inholding within Ouachita National Forest, located on the east side of Miles Road, north of Bonnerdale and east of Alamo. It is a single story dogtrot, with a log pen and a wooden frame pen separated by a breezeway under a gable roof. A shed-roof porch extends across the front, and the building is clad in weatherboard. The log pen has a trapdoor providing access to a dugout cellar, a feature not typically found in regional dogtrot houses. The log pen was built in 1882 by William Reeves, and the frame pen was built in 1888 by Larkin Melson.

The house was listed on the National Register of Historic Places in 1985.

See also
National Register of Historic Places listings in Montgomery County, Arkansas

References

Houses on the National Register of Historic Places in Arkansas
Houses completed in 1882
National Register of Historic Places in Montgomery County, Arkansas
1882 establishments in Arkansas
Ouachita National Forest
Dogtrot architecture in Arkansas